The 14th United States Colored Infantry Regiment was an infantry regiment that served in the Union Army during the American Civil War. The regiment was composed of African American enlisted men commanded by white officers and was authorized by the Bureau of Colored Troops which was created by the United States War Department on May 22, 1863.

Service
The 14th U.S. Colored Infantry was organized at Camp Stanton in Gallatin, Tennessee beginning November 16, 1863 and mustered in for three-year service under the command of Colonel Thomas Jefferson Morgan.

The regiment was attached to Post of Gallatin, Tennessee, to January 1864. Post of Chattanooga, Tennessee, Department of the Cumberland, to November 1864. Unattached, District of the Etowah, Department of the Cumberland, to December 1864. 1st Colored Brigade, District of the Etowah, to May 1865. District of East Tennessee, to August 1865. Department of the Tennessee and Department of Georgia until March 1866.

The 14th U.S. Colored Infantry mustered out of service March 26, 1866.

Detailed service
Garrison duty at Chattanooga, Tenn., until November 1864. March to relief of Dalton, Ga., August 14. Action at Dalton August 14–15. Siege of Decatur, Ala., October 27–30. Battle of Nashville, Tenn., December 15–16. Overton's Hill December 16. Pursuit of Hood to the Tennessee River December 17–28. Duty at Chattanooga and in the District of East Tennessee until July 1865. At Greenville and in the Department of the Tennessee until March 1866.

Commanders
 Colonel Thomas Jefferson Morgan
 Lieutenant Colonel Henry Clark Corbin

See also

 List of United States Colored Troops Civil War Units
 United States Colored Troops

References
 Dyer, Frederick H. A Compendium of the War of the Rebellion (Des Moines, IA: Dyer Pub. Co.), 1908.
Attribution

United States Colored Troops Civil War units and formations
Military units and formations established in 1863
Military units and formations disestablished in 1866